is a Japanese manga series written and illustrated by Asahi Sakano. It was serialized in Shueisha's shōnen manga magazine Weekly Shōnen Jump from February 2020 to June 2020, with its chapters collected in three tankōbon volumes.

Publication
Written and illustrated by Asahi Sakano, Guardian of the Witch was serialized for nineteen chapters in Shueisha's shōnen manga magazine Weekly Shōnen Jump from February 3 to June 22, 2020. Shueisha collected its chapters in three tankōbon volumes, released from May 13 to September 4, 2020.

The manga was digitally published in English by Viz Media on their Shonen Jump service, while Shueisha published it on their Manga Plus online platform. Viz Media published the three volumes digitally on August 24, 2021.

Volume list

References

External links
 

Dark fantasy anime and manga
Shōnen manga
Shueisha manga
Viz Media manga